Almaly (Almaly) is a station on Line 1 of the Almaty Metro. The station opened on December 1, 2011.

On August 10, 2010, construction workers at Almaly station went on strike after the construction company had failed to pay the workers' wages for three months.

References

External links 

 Almaty Metro English Guide

Almaty Metro stations
Railway stations opened in 2011
2011 establishments in Kazakhstan